Dosseh Dorian N'Goumou (born 26 January 1985) is a French rapper, singer, film producer and actor. He is the younger brother of Pit Baccardi.

Dosseh was born in Orléans, and raised in Saint-Jean-de-la-Ruelle, Centre. Starting his career at a young age, he appeared in a number of albums as collaborations with artists like Booba and Seth Gueko, in addition to Niro, Sofiane, Kaaris, Rim'K, Youssoupha, Médine and his brother Pit Baccardi. These include Bolide, Volumes 1 and 2 and Talents Fachés 2. In 2011, he launched  the mixtape Desperadoss followed by a series of mixtapes titled Summer Crack in three volumes (2011, 2012, 2015) and took part in the rap compilation We Made It in 2012. In 2013, he launched his film Karma, where he included a number of French rappers. In 2014, he was signed to the label Def Jam France giving him a wider promotion allowing him to appear in features with Gradur and Joke. In 2015, he released his street album  Perestroïka followed by his first studio album Yuri. He also collaborated with the Toronto rapper Tory Lanez. In 2018, he released the album Vidalo$$a, with the single "Habitué" peaking at number 1 on SNEP, the official French Singles Chart.

Discography

Albums
Studio albums

Street albums

Mixtapes

Featured in
2004: Bolide Vol. 1
2008: Bolide Vol. 2

Soundtracks

Singles

Other charting songs

Featured in

Filmography

Music videos

Films 
2018 Paradise Beach
Do-si-do

References

French rappers
French people of Cameroonian descent
French people of Togolese descent
1985 births
Living people